Teucrium myriocladum is a species of flowering plant in the family Lamiaceae and is endemic to the south-west of Western Australia. It is a shrub with small, hairy leaves and creamy-green flowers.

Description
Flowering mainly occurs from August to December, usually following rain.

Taxonomy
Teucrium myriocladum was formally described in 1904 by Ludwig Diels in Botanische Jahrbücher für Systematik, Pflanzengeschichte und Pflanzengeographie. The specific epithet (myriocladum) means "countless branches".

Distribution and habitat
This germander grows on plains and flats in open mallee woodland near Esperance in the south-west of Western Australia.

Conservation status
Teucrium myriocladum is classified as "not threatened" by the Western Australian Government Department of Parks and Wildlife.

References

myriocladum
Lamiales of Australia
Plants described in 1905
Taxa named by Ludwig Diels
Eudicots of Western Australia